Kamfiruz (also Romanized as Kāmfīrūz; also known as Kāmfīrūz-e Jonūbī, meaning "South Kamfiruz") is a city and capital of Kamfiruz District, in Marvdasht County, Fars Province, Iran. At the 2006 census, its population was 2,530, in 545 families.

History
Nndraj described in this city, writes:Sienna and the Gulf of new buildings Anushirwan Fairuz did not rain since years and he went to prayers for rain in the land, rain came Bbaryd and there he built a city and south of Kamfiruz called com. Kamfirouzi massive oak trees and willow thickets area is removed and it is Zrvr it Shrz·hast grove lions mine near the equinox is in that cold water is savory and the river.
South of Kamfiruz and history associated with it, there's another claim, for example at the time of the Persian Achaemenids in the three important political office there is a big state, one of which is south of Kamfiruz today, but it is not south of Kamfiruz Kyvprysh they said.

Friar Dionysus, while temporary stationed at Shiraz, wrote to the Sacred Congregation in 1640 about Kamfiruz;

Homes
Paradise Lost, that is the province of the natural landscape and unique in this region and around the village of Mangan and Mhjn Abad, the sides of the dam, which is located in the land as well as cascades "valid water" in the south of Kamfiruz input from the Shiraz is the region's attractions. In addition to this vast plain is located south of Kamfiruz in the surrounding mountain ranges and slopes of oak trees covered with abundant hot springs.

Topography
South of Kamfiruz plains with relatively broad perspective that can be read both valley and plain. The plains in the extreme 35 degrees northwest of Persepolis, ancient Astkhry (wheat) and West area of Pasargadae, in the East pillar of (white) and Dena mountain range is located in the south. Length 54 and a width of 30 km listed. Persepolis distance to 80 km. Its height from sea level to 1,800 meters, so a relatively moderate climate characterized by warm half the garlic and half the garlic is cool, around the mountain range of New Castle, Palngry, though, Qlatvn, suffering, Kvdyn, Hossein Abad, Dlkhan, five Crete, narrow beam, Kvnkvn, and Ali auxiliary, surrounded by the plains south of Kamfiruz he has made as a large tray. Overall, the large tray 994 square kilometers.

Springs
Many springs gushing mountain range south of Kamfiruz most important ones are:

Anjireh springs in the area south of Kamfiruz East that has a very pleasant climate and beautiful landscape, covered with trees and ornamental flowers are wild.
Bnar seasonal spring that is located in the upper peninsula of the same name and in the North East and East Village Khanymn Haji Abad village is located, is a few heavy rains this spring every year after it is plucked until late spring gives water. When the annual rainfall is less than 300 mm can not be cut this spring.
Qdhy springs from the slopes of the mountains Aliabad Upper leaks and runs throughout the year. Multi-family time together this spring Bbhayy Boyer Ahmadi live around it is empty now.
Spring Fox: In the narrow defile bar is located and aesthetically pleasing landscapes, waterfalls for a moment he plunged deep into the realms of fantasy with his sad life.
Warm Springs

People and life
Villages south of Kamfiruz regularly arranged on both sides of the river and the eastern half of the choir is more than Rvdd water. In Haykh of the land area is less, but the western half has more land and using less water is going deaf. The total arable land of 12 hectares in the south of Kamfiruz that 8 thousand hectares are under rice cultivation goes. Average rice yields 4 tons per hectare of local Champa.

References

Populated places in Marvdasht County
Cities in Fars Province